Akita Bank Red Arrows is a Japanese women's basketball club based in Akita, Akita, playing in the Japan Industrial and Commercial Basketball Federation. They play their home games at the Akita Prefectural Gymnasium, located on the Yabase Sports Park.

Coaches
Shigeyoshi Kasahara
Satoru Furuta
Takuo Aoki
Masato Ogasawara
Michihito Otaki
Naoko Hattori

Practice facilities
Akigin Gymnasium

Honors and titles
Japan Industrial and Commercial Basketball Federation Championships
Champions (10): 2001, 2003, 2005, 2006, 2007, 2008, 2013, 2014, 2017, 2018
Runners-up (1): 2015
Japan Industrial and Commercial Basketball Federation Competitions
Champions (3): 2005, 2006, 2007
Runners-up (5): 2002, 2011, 2012, 2013, 2017
Japan Industrial and Commercial Basketball Federation Regional League Championships
Champions (2): 2019, 2020
National Sports Festival of Japan
Champions (4): 2007, 2012, 2014, 2017

Gallery

See also
Prestige International Aranmare Akita

References

External links

Location map

2000 establishments in Japan
Akita Northern Happinets
Basketball teams in Japan
Basketball teams established in 2000
Basketball venues in Japan
Buildings and structures in Akita (city)
Sport in Akita (city)
Sports teams in Akita Prefecture
Sports venues in Akita Prefecture